Kim Na-young may refer to:

 Kim Nayoung (born 1966), South Korean artist, member of the collaborative art duo Gregory Maass & Nayoungim
 Kim Na-young (television personality) (born 1981), South Korean television personality
 Kim Na-young (judoka) (born 1988), South Korean judoka
 Kim Na-young (figure skater) (born 1990), South Korean figure skater
 Kim Na-young (singer) (born 1991), South Korean singer
 Kim Na-young (badminton, born 1995), South Korean badminton player
 Kim Na-young (badminton, born 1991), South Korean badminton player
 Kim Na-young (born 1995), South Korean singer, member of Gugudan
 Kim Na-young (born 2002), South Korean singer, member of Lightsum